Brockworth Court is a Tudor house in the village of Brockworth, Gloucestershire, England. It is a Grade II* listed building.

House
The original house was granted to Llanthony Secunda Priory in the 12th Century and remained as a Priors residence until the dissolution of the monasteries in 1540 when it was granted to the Guise family by Henry VIII. It was altered and extended in the 18th and 19th centuries. There is also a tithe barn dating from pre-Tudor times. Henry VIII and his second wife Anne Boleyn are noted as having visited in August 1535.

Brockworth Court was inhabited by John Guise, the new Lord of the Manor, in 1540.  Brockworth Court Tithe Barn was built in about the 13th century, with its size indicative the wealth of the Lord of the Manor at the time, Llanthony Priory.

The Tithe Barn was almost completely destroyed by fire in 1996 and rebuilt using traditional materials and methods. The restoration work was granted an award by the CPRE.
The Tithebarn hosts a number of wedding celebrations and the gardens for photographs. The gardens are also open on certain days for the NGS.

Nearby Brockworth Mill and Mill Farm were situated at the intersection of Mill Lane and Horsbere Brook. The Domesday Book records a corn mill in Brockworth. When the Witcombe reservoir was built in 1863 the mill stopped working and fell into neglect.

Gardens
The gardens at Brockworth Court are part of the National Gardens Scheme and are open to the public on selected days in May, June and September. There is an admission charge and home-made teas are available in the tithe barn. A tour of the house is available for groups of ten or more.

References

Sources

External links
Brockworth Court at greatbarns.org
Brockworth, St George's Church And Brockworth Court c.1955 at francisfrith.com
Brockworth Court at davidsgardendiary.wordpress.com

Country houses in Gloucestershire
Gardens in Gloucestershire
Hotels in Gloucestershire
Houses completed in 1539
Grade II* listed houses
Grade II* listed buildings in Gloucestershire
1539 establishments in England